HMS Revenge was a 70-gun third rate ship of the line of the Royal Navy, launched at Deptford Dockyard in 1699.

She was renamed HMS Buckingham in 1711, and hulked in 1727. Buckingham continued to serve in this role until 1745, when she was sunk to form part of the foundation of a breakwater.

Notes

References

Lavery, Brian (2003) The Ship of the Line - Volume 1: The development of the battlefleet 1650-1850. Conway Maritime Press. .

Ships of the line of the Royal Navy
1690s ships
Ships sunk as breakwaters